Lelio Antoniotti (17 January 1928 – 29 March 2014) was an Italian football player.

References

External links

1928 births
2014 deaths
Italian footballers
Serie A players
Aurora Pro Patria 1919 players
S.S. Lazio players
Torino F.C. players
Juventus F.C. players
L.R. Vicenza players
Novara F.C. players
Association football forwards